John McCrary is an American former Negro league pitcher who played in the 1940s.

McCrary played for the New York Black Yankees in 1943. In five recorded appearances, he posted a 14.63 ERA over 16 innings.

References

External links
 and Seamheads

Year of birth missing
Place of birth missing
New York Black Yankees players
Baseball pitchers